Steninae is a subfamily of Staphylinidae.

Anatomy
Antennae interested on vertex between eyes.
Eyes very large.
Tarsi 5-5-5.

Ecology
Habitat: damp areas near streams.
Collection method: hand collection, sweep net, sifting leaf litter near streams.
Biology: specialized predators of Collembola.

Systematics
Two genera, Dianous (2 spp.) and Stenus (167 spp.) in North America.

References

External links

Steninae at Bugguide.net. 

 
Articles containing video clips
Beetles described in 1825
Beetles of North America
Beetle subfamilies